Valeriu Nemerenco is a Moldovan politician.

Biography 

He served as praetor of Chişinău's Buiucani district. He has been a member of the Parliament of Moldova since 2009.

His doctoral dissertation in law, Models and systems of public administration of the capital-municipalities, 2008, contains an in-depth analysis of the public municipality administration system in Chişinău.

External links 
 NEMERENCO VALERIU, Models and systems of public administration of the capital-municipalities, 2008
 Site-ul Parlamentului Republicii Moldova
 Site-ul Partidului Liberal
 Un deputat, acuzat de încălcarea legislaţiei privind protecţia datelor cu caracter personal

References

1959 births
Living people
Moldova State University alumni
Liberal Party (Moldova) MPs
Moldovan MPs 2009–2010
Moldovan MPs 2009
Moldovan jurists